Otto I of Schwerin (died 1357) was a son of Count Gunzelin VI and Richardis of Tecklenburg.  In 1327, he succeeded his father as Count of Schwerin.

Otto was married to Princess Mathilda of Werle, a daughter of John III of Werle.  They had a daughter:
 Richardis (d. 1377).  She married Albert III of Mecklenburg-Schwerin (1340–1412), who was also king of Sweden.

Otto I died in 1357.  He had no male heir and was succeeded by his brother Nicholas I.

Schwerin
Counts of Schwerin
Year of birth uncertain
1357 deaths
House of Hagen